Alwarkurichi is a panchayat town in Tenkasi district  in the state of Tamil Nadu, India.

Location 

Alwarkurichi is a small town  35 km or 45 Min travel from west of Tirunelveli town and 25 km from Tenkasi town. Located near western ghats (Ambasamudram - Tenkasi highway)  surrounded by paddy fields, western ghats locate west of the town. The village has Gadananathi River on its east and rama river on its west

Demographics 
 India census, Alwarkurichi had a population of 9447. Males constitute 50% of the population and females 50%.  Alwarkurichi has an average literacy rate of 71%, higher than the national average of 59.5%; with 56% of the males and 44% of females literate. 11% of the population is under 6 years of age.

References 

Cities and towns in Tenkasi district